Patti Wheeler, is the president and owner of Wheeler Television, Inc., a television production company specializing in motorsports for national broadcast and cable networks.  Wheeler is an Executive Member of Cannon School Trustee board and a member of the board of the Lake Norman YMCA.

Early life
Wheeler was born in Charlotte, North Carolina June 11, 1963.  She is the daughter of former Lowe's Motor Speedway President and General Manager Humpy Wheeler.

Education
Wheeler earned a bachelor's degree in English from Belmont Abbey College in 1986.

Wheeler Television Inc.
Wheeler is the president and owner of Wheeler Television, Inc, which is a television production company.  The company produces motorsports related material and has worked with Fox Sports, SPEED, ESPN, ABC, NBC and CBS for live race programming, documentaries, episodic and news series.

Early career
Wheeler started her career at twenty-two as a producer and director of live NASCAR and as a writer and producer for various news and documentary series from 1986 to 1991.  She was also Director of Motorsports and Executive Producer for TNN from 1991 to 1995.  Wheeler was then President of World Sports Enterprises a subsidiary of Viacom from 1994-2000.

Family
Wheeler is the daughter of former Lowe's Motor Speedway President and General Manager Humpy Wheeler.  She is married to Leo Hindery Jr. and has two children.

Awards and recognition
 NASCAR’s Top 25 Most Powerful People – Charlotte Observer
 Racing’s Most Influential: Television Executives – Racer magazine
 Top Forty Under Forty – Charlotte Business Journal
 Top 25 Women In Business Award – Charlotte Business Journal

Sources
 
 

1963 births
Living people
21st-century American businesspeople
Belmont Abbey College alumni